The 1969 New York Mets season was the team's eighth as a Major League Baseball (MLB) franchise and culminated when they won the World Series over the Baltimore Orioles. They played their home games at Shea Stadium and were managed by Gil Hodges. The team is often referred to as the "Amazin' Mets" (a nickname coined by Casey Stengel, who managed the team from their inaugural season to 1965) or the "Miracle Mets".

The 1969 season was the first season of divisional play in Major League Baseball. The Mets were assigned to the newly created National League East division. In their seven previous seasons, the Mets had never finished higher than ninth place in the ten-team National League and had never had a winning season. They lost at least one hundred games in five of the seasons. However, they overcame mid-season difficulties while the division leaders for much of the season, the Chicago Cubs, suffered a late-season collapse. The Mets finished 100–62, eight games ahead of the Cubs. They went on to defeat the National League West champion Atlanta Braves three games to none in the inaugural National League Championship Series, and defeat the American League champion Orioles in five games. First baseman Donn Clendenon was named the World Series' most valuable player on the strength of his .357 batting average, three home runs, and four runs batted in.

On Saturday, August 22, 2009, many of the surviving members of the 1969 championship team reunited at the New York Mets' present park, Citi Field.

Offseason 
 October 16, 1968: Sold Don Bosch to the Montreal Expos

Trades

Spring training 
The Mets held spring training at Al Lang Stadium in St. Petersburg, Florida, for the 8th season.

Regular season 

The Mets had never finished higher than ninth place in a ten-team league in their first seven seasons. As an expansion team, they went 40–120 in 1962, the most losses by an MLB team in one season in the 20th century, and the 1962 Mets' .250 winning percentage was higher than only the .248 posted by the 1935 Boston Braves.

The Mets never had been over .500 after the ninth game of any season. Seven years after their disastrous inaugural season, "The Amazin' Mets" (as nicknamed by previous manager Casey Stengel) won the World Series, the first expansion team to do so.

1969 was the first year of divisional baseball, precipitated by the expansion of each league from 10 to 12 teams. The Kansas City Royals and Seattle Pilots joined the American League. The San Diego Padres and Montreal Expos joined the National League. Before 1969, the first place team in each league advanced directly to the World Series. Under the new structure, each league was divided into East and West divisions, each comprising six teams, with the divisional winners facing off in a best-of-five playoff for the right to represent their league in the World Series. The Mets were slotted into the National League Eastern Division, along with the Chicago Cubs, the Philadelphia Phillies, the Pittsburgh Pirates, expansion Montreal Expos, and the St. Louis Cardinals, who had been World Champions in 1964 and 1967 and losers of the 1968 World Series. For the first time since joining the National League in 1962, the Mets could finish no lower than 6th. The New York Times journalist, Joseph Durso, predicted the Mets would finish 4th in the East, ahead of the Pirates and the Expos.

On Tuesday April 8, with 44,541 fans in attendance at Shea Stadium, the Mets and the Expos played the first international baseball game in major league baseball history. The Mets had lost seven straight opening day games since joining the national league in 1962. That dubious record reached eight when the Expos prevailed in an 11-10 slugfest, despite the Mets scoring four runs with two down in the bottom of the ninth, highlighted by a pinch hit three-run homer by Duffy Dyer. Apparently, this was axiomatic Mets baseball, as one columnist described the Mets as "masters of the lingering death."

The Mets took the next two games from the Expos, but then lost six of the following 7 games, bringing their record to 3–7. After a 9–14 start, the Mets won 9 of their next 13 games, including consecutive shutouts in late April against the Cubs and Expos. When Tom Seaver shutout the Atlanta Braves 5–0 on May 21, the Mets were 18-18, their best start in franchise history. But the Mets lost their next five games, starting with a 15-3 drubbing from the Atlanta Braves, followed by a 3-game sweep by the Astros, who outscored the Mets 18–4, and finishing with a loss at Shea Stadium to the lowly Padres. At the end of play on May 27, the Mets' record stood at 18–23. Then, in late May, the Mets reeled off a club-record 11 straight wins, which included three walk-off wins and dominant pitching, as the Mets pitching staff yielded a stingy 2-runs per game. Starting with their 42nd game, the Mets went 82–39 (a .678 winning percentage), including an astonishing 38–11 in their last 49 games.

Despite that performance, the Mets suffered two mid-season three-game series sweeps at the hands of the Houston Astros, who manhandled the Mets all season, taking 10 of the 12 games the teams played.
They were also no-hit by Bob Moose of the Pittsburgh Pirates on September 20, only five days after becoming the first major league team to strike out 19 times in a nine-inning game, a game they won, 4–3, on a pair of two-run home runs by Ron Swoboda, against the Cardinals' Steve Carlton.

Trailing the Chicago Cubs for much of the season, the Mets found themselves in third place, 10 games back, on August 14 but they won 14 of their last 17 games during August, and 24 of their 32 games during September and October, to surge past the Cubs, finishing 100–62, eight games ahead of the Cubs. That 18 game differential is one of the largest turnarounds in MLB history.

Season standings

National League East

Record vs. opponents

Schedule and results

Regular season 

|-  style="text-align:center; background:#fbb;"
| 1 || April 8 || Expos || 10–11 || Shaw (1–0) || Koonce (0–1) || Sembera (1) || 44,541 || Shea Stadium || 0–1 ||  Boxscore || 4 || −1 || 2:05 PM EST || WOR-TV ||
|-  style="text-align:center; background:#bfb;"
| 2 || April 9 || Expos || 9–5 || McGraw (1–0) || Stoneman (0–1) || Ryan (1) || 13,827 || Shea Stadium || 1–1 ||  Boxscore || 3 || −1 || 2:05 PM EST || WOR-TV ||
|-  style="text-align:center; background:#bfb;"
| 3 || April 10 || Expos || 4–2 || Gentry (1–0) || Jaster (0–1) || Koonce (1) || 8,608 || Shea Stadium || 2–1 ||  Boxscore || 3 || −1 || 2:05 PM EST || WOR-TV ||
|-  style="text-align:center; background:#fbb;"
| 4 || April 11 || Cardinals || 5–6 || || Koosman (0–1) || || 12,591 || Shea Stadium || 2–2 ||  Boxscore || 3 || −2 || || WOR-TV ||
|-  style="text-align:center; background:#fbb;"
| 5 || April 12 || Cardinals || 0–1 || || Cardwell (0–1) || || 19,510 || Shea Stadium || 2–3 ||  Boxscore || 3 || −2 || || WOR-TV ||
|-  style="text-align:center; background:#fbb;"
| 6 || April 13 || Cardinals || 1–3 || || Seaver (0–1) || || 25,314 || Shea Stadium || 2–4 ||  Boxscore || 4 || −3 || || WOR-TV ||
|-  style="text-align:center; background:#fbb;"
| 7 || April 14 || @ Phillies || 1–5 || || McAndrew (0–1) || || 13,070 || Connie Mack Stadium || 2–5 ||  Boxscore || 5 || −4 || 7:35 PM EST || WOR-TV ||
|-  style="text-align:center; background:#bfb;"
| 8 || April 15 || @ Phillies || 6–3 || Gentry (2–0) || || Koonce (2) || 2,880 || Connie Mack Stadium || 3–5 ||  Boxscore || 4 || −4 || 7:35 PM EST || WOR-TV ||
|-  style="text-align:center; background:#fbb;"
| 9 || April 16 || @ Pirates || 3–11 || || Koosman (0–2) || || 7,666 || Forbes Field || 3–6 ||  Boxscore || 5 || −5 || 8:05 PM EST || WOR-TV ||
|-  style="text-align:center; background:#fbb;"
| 10 || April 17 || @ Pirates || 0–4 || ||  Cardwell (0–2) || || 8,097 || Forbes Field || 3–7 ||  Boxscore || 5 || −6 || 8:05 PM EST || WOR-TV ||
|-  style="text-align:center; background:#bbb;"
| || April 18 || @ Cardinals || colspan=5|Postponed (rain); rescheduled for July 1 || Busch Memorial Stadium || || || || bgcolor="ffbbbb" | –6 || || ||
|-  style="text-align:center; background:#bfb;"
| 11 || April 19 || @ Cardinals || 2–1 || Seaver (1–1) || || || 20,716 || Busch Memorial Stadium || 4–7 ||  Boxscore || 4 || −6 || || WOR-TV ||
|-  style="text-align:center; background:#bfb;"
| 12 || April 20 || @ Cardinals || 11–3 || Ryan (1–0) || || Koonce (3) || 19,065 || Busch Memorial Stadium || 5–7 ||  Boxscore || 3 || −5½ || || WOR-TV ||
|-  style="text-align:center; background:#fbb;"
| 13 || April 21 || Phillies || 1–2(11)|| || Taylor (0–1) || || 9,286 || Shea Stadium || 5–8 ||  Boxscore || 3 || −6 || || WOR-TV ||
|-  style="text-align:center; background:#bbb;"
| || April 22 || Phillies || colspan=5|Postponed (rain); rescheduled for September 5 || Shea Stadium || || || || bgcolor="ffbbbb" | −5 || || ||
|-  style="text-align:center; background:#bfb;"
| 14 || April 23 || Pirates || 2–0 || Koosman (1–2) || || || 7,274 || Shea Stadium || 6–8 ||  Boxscore || 3 || −4½ || || WOR-TV ||
|-  style="text-align:center; background:#bbb;"
| || April 24 || Pirates || colspan=5|Postponed (rain); rescheduled for September 19 || Shea Stadium || || || || bgcolor="ffbbbb" | –5 || || ||
|-  style="text-align:center; background:#fbb;"
| 15 || April 25 || Cubs || 1–3 || Jenkins (3–1) || Seaver (1–2) || || 18,548 || Shea Stadium || 6–9 ||  Boxscore || 4 || −5 || || WOR-TV ||
|-  style="text-align:center; background:#fbb;"
| 16 || April 26 || Cubs || 3–9 || ||  Cardwell (0–3) || || 16,252 || Shea Stadium || 6–10 ||  Boxscore || 5 || −6 || || WOR-TV ||
|-  style="text-align:center; background:#fbb;"
| 17 || April 27 || Cubs || 6–8 || || Koonce (0–2) || || N/A || Shea Stadium || 6–11 ||  Boxscore || 4 || −6 || || WOR-TV ||
|-  style="text-align:center; background:#bfb;"
| 18 || April 27 || Cubs || 3–0 || McGraw (2–0) || || || 37,437 || Shea Stadium || 7–11 ||  Boxscore || 4 || −6 || || WOR-TV ||
|-  style="text-align:center; background:#bfb;"
| 19 || April 29 || @ Expos || 2–0 || Ryan (2–0) || || || 8,577 || Jarry Park || 8–11 ||  Boxscore || 3 || −6½ || 4:05 PM EDT || ||
|-  style="text-align:center; background:#bfb;"
| 20 || April 30 || @ Expos || 2–1 || Seaver (2–2) || || || 19,024 || Jarry Park || 9–11 ||  Boxscore || 3 || −5½ || 8:05 PM EDT || WOR-TV ||
|-

|-  style="text-align:center; background:#fbb;"
| 21 || May 1 || @ Expos || 2–3 || ||  Cardwell (0–4) || || 7,741 || Jarry Park || 9–12 ||  Boxscore || 4 || −6 || 4:05 PM EDT || ||
|-  style="text-align:center; background:#fbb;"
| 22 || May 2 || @ Cubs || 4–6 || || Gentry (2–1) || || 14,702 || Wrigley Field || 9–13 ||  Boxscore || 5 || −7 || || ||
|-  style="text-align:center; background:#fbb;"
| 23 || May 3 || @ Cubs || 2–3 || || Koonce (0–3) || || 23,228 || Wrigley Field || 9–14 ||  Boxscore || 5 || −8 || 2:15 PM EDT || WOR-TV ||
|-  style="text-align:center; background:#bfb;"
| 24 || May 4 || @ Cubs || 3–2 || Seaver (3–2) || || || N/A || Wrigley Field || 10–14 ||  Boxscore || 4 || −6 || || WOR-TV ||
|-  style="text-align:center; background:#bfb;"
| 25 || May 4 || @ Cubs || 3–2 || McGraw (3–0) || || || 40,484 || Wrigley Field || 11–14 ||  Boxscore || 4 || −6 || || WOR-TV ||
|-  style="text-align:center; background:#bfb;"
| 26 || May 6 || Reds || 8–1 ||  Cardwell (1–4) || || || 12,291 || Shea Stadium || 12–14 ||  Boxscore || 4 || −6 || || WOR-TV ||
|-  style="text-align:center; background:#fbb;"
| 27 || May 7 || Reds || 0–3 || || Gentry (2–2) || || 9,242 || Shea Stadium || 12–15 ||  Boxscore || 4 || −6 || || WOR-TV ||
|-  style="text-align:center; background:#bbb;"
| || May 9 || Astros || colspan=5|Postponed (rain); rescheduled for July 30 || Shea Stadium || || || || bgcolor="ffbbbb" | –5 || || ||
|-  style="text-align:center; background:#bfb;"
| 28 || May 10 || Astros || 3–1 || Seaver (4–2) || || || 14,981 || Shea Stadium || 13–15 ||  Boxscore || 3 || −5 || || WOR-TV ||
|-  style="text-align:center; background:#fbb;"
| 29 || May 11 || Astros || 1–4 || ||  Cardwell (1–5) || || N/A || Shea Stadium || 13–16 ||  Boxscore || 3 || −5½ || || WOR-TV ||
|-  style="text-align:center; background:#bfb;"
| 30 || May 11 || Astros || 11–7 || Koonce (1–3) || || || 19,456 || Shea Stadium || 14–16 ||  Boxscore || 3 || −5½ || || WOR-TV ||
|-  style="text-align:center; background:#fbb;"
| 31 || May 13 || Braves || 3–4 || Reed (5–1) || Gentry (2–3) || Upshaw (8) || 12,332 || Shea Stadium || 14–17 ||  Boxscore || 3 || −7 || || WOR-TV ||
|-  style="text-align:center; background:#bfb;"
| 32 || May 14 || Braves || 9–3 || Seaver (5–2) || Niekro (5–2) || Taylor (1) || 15,365 || Shea Stadium || 15–17 ||  Boxscore || 3 || −7 || || WOR-TV ||
|-  style="text-align:center; background:#fbb;"
| 33 || May 15 || Braves || 5–6 || Jarvis (3–2) ||  Cardwell (1–6) || Upshaw (9) || 14,370 || Shea Stadium || 15–18 ||  Boxscore || 3 || −7½ || || ||
|-  style="text-align:center; background:#bfb;"
| 34 || May 16 || @ Reds || 10–9 || Koonce (2–3) || || || 11,736 || Crosley Field || 16–18 ||  Boxscore || 3 || −7½ || 8:05 PM EDT || WOR-TV ||
|-  style="text-align:center; background:#bfb;"
| 35 || May 17 || @ Reds || 11–3 || Gentry (3–3) || || || 8,925 || Crosley Field || 17–18 ||  Boxscore || 3 || −6½ || 8:05 PM EDT || WOR-TV ||
|-  style="text-align:center; background:#bbb;"
| || May 18 || @ Reds || colspan=5|Postponed (rain); rescheduled for August 5 || Crosley Field || || || || bgcolor="ffbbbb" | –6 || || ||
|-  style="text-align:center; background:#bfb;"
| 36 || May 21 || @ Braves || 5–0 || Seaver (6–2) || Niekro (5–3) || || 14,669 || Atlanta Stadium || 18–18 ||  Boxscore || 3 || −5½ || || WOR-TV ||
|-  style="text-align:center; background:#fbb;"
| 37 || May 22 || @ Braves || 3–15 || Jarvis (4–2) || McGraw (3–1) || Stone (1) || 12,574 || Atlanta Stadium || 18–19 ||  Boxscore || 3 || −6½ || || WOR-TV ||
|-  style="text-align:center; background:#fbb;"
| 38 || May 23 || @ Astros || 0–7 || || Gentry (3–4) || || 10,825 || Astrodome || 18–20 ||  Boxscore || 4 || −7½ || || WOR-TV ||
|-  style="text-align:center; background:#fbb;"
| 39 || May 24 || @ Astros || 1–5 || || Koosman (1–3) || || 17,911 || Astrodome || 18–21 ||  Boxscore || 4 || −8½ || 8:30 PM EDT || WOR-TV ||
|-  style="text-align:center; background:#fbb;"
| 40 || May 25 || @ Astros || 3–6 || || Seaver (6–3) || || 22,716 || Astrodome || 18–22 ||  Boxscore || 4 || −9 || || WOR-TV ||
|-  style="text-align:center; background:#fbb;"
| 41 || May 27 || Padres || 2–3 || || McAndrew (0–2) || || 11,772 || Shea Stadium || 18–23 ||  Boxscore || 4 || −9 || || WOR-TV ||
|-  style="text-align:center; background:#bfb;"
| 42 || May 28 || Padres || 1–0(11)|| McGraw (4–1) || || || 11,860 || Shea Stadium || 19–23 ||  Boxscore || 4 || −9 || || WOR-TV ||
|-  style="text-align:center; background:#bfb;"
| 43 || May 30 || Giants || 4–3 || Seaver (7–3) || || Taylor (2) || 52,272 || Shea Stadium || 20–23 ||  Boxscore || 3 || −9 || || WOR-TV ||
|-  style="text-align:center; background:#bfb;"
| 44 || May 31 || Giants || 4–2 || Gentry (4–4) || || McGraw (1) || 32,178 || Shea Stadium || 21–23 ||  Boxscore || 3 || −9 || || WOR-TV ||
|-

|-  style="text-align:center; background:#bfb;"
| 45 || June 1 || Giants || 5–4 || Taylor (1–1) || || || 41,294 || Shea Stadium || 22–23 ||  Boxscore || 3 || −9 || || WOR-TV ||
|-  style="text-align:center; background:#bfb;"
| 46 || June 2 || Dodgers || 2–1 || Koosman (2–3) || || || 22,600 || Shea Stadium || 23–23 ||  Boxscore || 3 || −8½ || || ||
|-  style="text-align:center; background:#bfb;"
| 47 || June 3 || Dodgers || 5–2 || Seaver (8–3) || || McGraw (2) || 24,212 || Shea Stadium || 24–23 ||  Boxscore || 2 || −8½ || || WOR-TV ||
|-  style="text-align:center; background:#bfb;"
| 48 || June 4 || Dodgers || 1–0(15)|| Taylor (2–1) || || || 31,331 || Shea Stadium || 25–23 ||  Boxscore || 2 || −8½ || || WOR-TV ||
|-  style="text-align:center; background:#bfb;"
| 49 || June 6 || @ Padres || 5–3 || Gentry (5–4) || || Taylor (3) || 11,203 || San Diego Stadium || 26–23 ||  Boxscore || 2 || −8½ || 11:00 PM EDT || ||
|-  style="text-align:center; background:#bfb;"
| 50 || June 7 || @ Padres || 4–1 || Koosman (3–3) || || || 10,827 || San Diego Stadium || 27–23 ||  Boxscore || 2 || −8 || || ||
|-  style="text-align:center; background:#bfb;"
| 51 || June 8 || @ Padres || 3–2 || Seaver (9–3) || || Taylor (4) || 8,568 || San Diego Stadium || 28–23 ||  Boxscore || 2 || −7½ || || WOR-TV ||
|-  style="text-align:center; background:#bfb;"
| 52 || June 10 || @ Giants || 9–4 ||  Cardwell (2–6) || || Taylor (5) || 6,038 || Candlestick Park || 29–23||  Boxscore || 2 || −7 || 11:00 PM EDT || ||
|-  style="text-align:center; background:#fbb;"
| 53 || June 11 || @ Giants || 2–7 || || Gentry (5–5) || || 3,935 || Candlestick Park || 29–24 ||  Boxscore || 2 || −7 || 4:00 PM EDT || WOR-TV ||
|-  style="text-align:center; background:#fbb;"
| 54 || June 13 || @ Dodgers || 0–1 || || Koosman (3–4) || || 20,042 || Dodger Stadium || 29–25 ||  Boxscore || 2 || −8½ || 11:00 PM EDT || ||
|-  style="text-align:center; background:#bfb;"
| 55 || June 14 || @ Dodgers || 3–1 || Seaver (10–3) || || McGraw (3) || 26,727 || Dodger Stadium || 30–25 ||  Boxscore || 2 || −8½ || 11:00 PM EDT || ||
|-  style="text-align:center; background:#fbb;"
| 56 || June 15 || @ Dodgers || 2–3 || || DiLauro (0–1) || || 28,086 || Dodger Stadium || 30–26 ||  Boxscore || 2 || −9 || 4:00 PM EDT || WOR-TV ||
|-  style="text-align:center; background:#bfb;"
| 57 || June 17 || @ Phillies || 1–0 || Gentry (6–5) || || || N/A || Connie Mack Stadium || 31–26 ||  Boxscore || 2 || −7½ || || ||
|-  style="text-align:center; background:#fbb;"
| 58 || June 17 || @ Phillies || 3–7 || ||  Cardwell (2–7) || || 17,259 || Connie Mack Stadium || 31–27 ||  Boxscore || 2 || −7½ || || ||
|-  style="text-align:center; background:#bfb;"
| 59 || June 18 || @ Phillies || 2–0 || Koosman (4–4) || || || 5,608 || Connie Mack Stadium || 32–27 ||  Boxscore || 2 || −7 || || WOR-TV ||
|-  style="text-align:center; background:#bfb;"
| 60 || June 19 || @ Phillies || 6–5 || Taylor (3–1) || || McGraw (4) || 6,871 || Connie Mack Stadium || 33–27 ||  Boxscore || 2 || −6 || || WOR-TV ||
|-  style="text-align:center; background:#bfb;"
| 61 || June 20 || Cardinals || 4–3 || Ryan (3–0) || || McGraw (5) || 54,083 || Shea Stadium || 34–27 ||  Boxscore || 2 || −6 || || WOR-TV ||
|-  style="text-align:center; background:#fbb;"
| 62 || June 21 || Cardinals || 3–5 || || DiLauro (0–2) || || 29,628 || Shea Stadium || 34–28 ||  Boxscore || 2 || −6 || || WOR-TV ||
|-  style="text-align:center; background:#bfb;"
| 63 || June 22 || Cardinals || 5–1 || Gentry (7–5) || || Koonce (4) || N/A || Shea Stadium || 35–28 ||  Boxscore || 2 || −5 || || WOR-TV ||
|-  style="text-align:center; background:#bfb;"
| 64 || June 22 || Cardinals || 1–0 || Koosman (5–4) || || || 55,862 || Shea Stadium || 36–28 ||  Boxscore || 2 || −5 || || WOR-TV ||
|-  style="text-align:center; background:#bfb;"
| 65 || June 24 || Phillies || 2–1 || Seaver (11–3) || || || N/A || Shea Stadium || 37–28 ||  Boxscore || 2 || −5 || || WOR-TV ||
|-  style="text-align:center; background:#bfb;"
| 66 || June 24 || Phillies || 5–0 || McAndrew (1–2) || || Taylor (6) || 39,843 || Shea Stadium || 38–28 ||  Boxscore || 2 || −5 || || WOR-TV ||
|-  style="text-align:center; background:#fbb;"
| 67 || June 25 || Phillies || 5–6(10)|| || Taylor (3–2) || || 27,814 || Shea Stadium || 38–29 ||  Boxscore || 2 || −6 || || WOR-TV ||
|-  style="text-align:center; background:#fbb;"
| 68 || June 26 || Phillies || 0–2 || ||  Cardwell (2–8) || || 15,360 || Shea Stadium || 38–30 ||  Boxscore || 2 || −7 || || ||
|-  style="text-align:center; background:#fbb;"
| 69 || June 27 || Pirates || 1–3 || || Koosman (5–5) || || 42,276 || Shea Stadium || 38–31 ||  Boxscore || 2 || −7 || || WOR-TV ||
|-  style="text-align:center; background:#fbb;"
| 70 || June 28 || Pirates || 4–7 || || Gentry (7–6) || || 48,398 || Shea Stadium || 38–32 ||  Boxscore || 2 || −8 || || WOR-TV ||
|-  style="text-align:center; background:#bfb;"
| 71 || June 29 || Pirates || 7–3 || Seaver (12–3) || || || 27,455 || Shea Stadium || 39–32 ||  Boxscore || 2 || −8½ || || WOR-TV ||
|-  style="text-align:center; background:#bfb;"
| 72 || June 30 || @ Cardinals || 10–2 || McAndrew (2–2) || || || 17,476 || Busch Memorial Stadium || 40–32 ||  Boxscore || 2 || −7½ || 9:00 PM EDT || WOR-TV ||
|-

|-  style="text-align:center; background:#fbb;"
| 73 || July 1 || @ Cardinals || 1–4 || || Ryan (3–1) || || N/A || Busch Memorial Stadium || 40–33 ||  Boxscore || 2 || −8 || 6:00 PM EDT || WOR-TV ||
|-  style="text-align:center; background:#fbb;"
| 74 || July 1 || @ Cardinals || 5–8 || || DiLauro (0–3) || || 19,799 || Busch Memorial Stadium || 40–34 ||  Boxscore || 2 || −8 || 8:29 PM EDT || WOR-TV ||
|-  style="text-align:center; background:#bfb;"
| 75 || July 2 || @ Cardinals || 6–4(14)|| McGraw (5–1) || || || 14,928 || Busch Memorial Stadium || 41–34 ||  Boxscore || 2 || −8 || 9:00 PM EDT || WOR-TV ||
|-  style="text-align:center; background:#bfb;"
| 76 || July 3 || @ Cardinals || 8–1 || Gentry (8–6) || || || 11,070 || Busch Memorial Stadium || 42–34 ||  Boxscore || 2 || −8 || || ||
|-  style="text-align:center; background:#bfb;"
| 77 || July 4 || @ Pirates || 11–6 || Seaver (13–3) || || Koonce (5) || N/A || Forbes Field || 43–34 ||  Boxscore || 2 || −7½ || 10:35 AM EDT || WOR-TV ||
|-  style="text-align:center; background:#bfb;"
| 78 || July 4 || @ Pirates || 9–2 ||  Cardwell (3–8) || || || 17,631 || Forbes Field || 44–34 ||  Boxscore || 2 || −7½ || 1:57 PM EDT || WOR-TV ||
|-  style="text-align:center; background:#bbb;"
| || July 5 || @ Pirates || colspan=5|Postponed (rain); rescheduled for September 12 || Forbes Field || || || || bgcolor="ffbbbb" | –6½ || || ||
|-  style="text-align:center; background:#bfb;"
| 79 || July 6 || @ Pirates || 8–7 || Taylor (4–2) || || Koonce (6) || 11,552 || Forbes Field || 45–34 || Boxscore || 2 || −5½ || 1:35 PM EDT || WOR-TV ||
|-  style="text-align:center; background:#bfb;"
| 80 || July 8 || Cubs || 4–3 || Koosman (6–5) || Jenkins (11–6) || || 55,096 || Shea Stadium || 46–34 ||  Boxscore || 2 || −4½ || || WOR-TV ||
|-  style="text-align:center; background:#bfb;"
| 81 || July 9 || Cubs || 4–0 || Seaver (14–3) || || || 50,709 || Shea Stadium || 47–34 ||  Boxscore || 2 || −3½ || || WOR-TV ||
|-  style="text-align:center; background:#fbb;"
| 82 || July 10 || Cubs || 2–6 || || Gentry (8–7) || || 36,012 || Shea Stadium || 47–35 ||  Boxscore || 2 || −4½ || || ||
|-  style="text-align:center; background:#fbb;"
| 83 || July 11 || Expos || 4–11 || || McAndrew (2–3) || || 36,012 || Shea Stadium || 47–36 ||  Boxscore || 2 || −4½ || || WOR-TV ||
|-  style="text-align:center; background:#bbb;"
| || July 12 || Expos || colspan=5|Postponed (rain); rescheduled for September 10 || Shea Stadium || || || || bgcolor="ffbbbb" | –5 || || ||
|-  style="text-align:center; background:#bfb;"
| 84 || July 13 || Expos || 4–3 || Koosman (7–5) || || || N/A || Shea Stadium || 48–36 ||  Boxscore || 2 || −5 || || WOR-TV ||
|-  style="text-align:center; background:#bfb;"
| 85 || July 13 || Expos || 9–7 || Koonce (3–3) || || Taylor (7) || 40,653 || Shea Stadium || 49–36 || Boxscore || 2 || −5 || || WOR-TV ||
|-  style="text-align:center; background:#fbb;"
| 86 || July 14 || @ Cubs || 0–1 || || Seaver (14–4) || || 37,473 || Wrigley Field || 49–37 ||  Boxscore || 2 || −6 || || ||
|-  style="text-align:center; background:#bfb;"
| 87 || July 15 || @ Cubs || 5–4 || Gentry (9–7) || || Taylor (8) || 38,608 || Wrigley Field || 50–37 ||  Boxscore || 2 || −5 || || ||
|-  style="text-align:center; background:#bfb;"
| 88 || July 16 || @ Cubs || 9–5 || Koonce (4–3) || Jenkins (12–7) || Taylor (9) || 36,795 || Wrigley Field || 51–37 ||  Boxscore || 2 || −4 || || ||
|-  style="text-align:center; background:#bfb;"
| 89 || July 18 || @ Expos || 5–2 || Koosman (8–5) || || || 23,507 || Jarry Park || 52–37 ||  Boxscore || 2 || −4 || || WOR-TV ||
|-  style="text-align:center; background:#fbb;"
| 90 || July 19 || @ Expos || 4–5 || || Seaver (14–5) || || 21,493 || Jarry Park || 52–38 ||  Boxscore || 2 || −4 || || || NBC
|-  style="text-align:center; background:#fbb;"
| 91 || July 20 || @ Expos || 2–3 || || Gentry (9–8) || || N/A || Jarry Park || 52–39 ||  Boxscore || 2 || −5 || || WOR-TV ||
|-  style="text-align:center; background:#bfb;"
| 92 || July 20 || @ Expos || 4–3(10)|| DiLauro (1–3) || || || 27,356 || Jarry Park || 53–39 ||  Boxscore || 2 || −5 || || WOR-TV ||
|- align="center" bgcolor="bbcaff"
|colspan="3" bgcolor="#bbcaff"| July 23: All-Star Game (NL wins—) || 9–3 || Carlton (STL) || Stottlemyre (NYY) || || 45,259 || RFK Stadium || colspan=7|  Washington, D.C.
|-  style="text-align:center; background:#fbb;"
| 93 || July 24 || Reds || 3–4(12)|| || McGraw (5–2) || || 30,934 || Shea Stadium || 53–40 ||  Boxscore || 2 || −6 || || WOR-TV ||
|-  style="text-align:center; background:#bfb;"
| 94 || July 25 || Reds || 4–3 || Taylor (5–2) || || || 37,470 || Shea Stadium || 54–40 ||  Boxscore || 2 || −5 || || WOR-TV ||
|-  style="text-align:center; background:#bfb;"
| 95 || July 26 || Reds || 3–2 || Seaver (15–5) || || || 25,259 || Shea Stadium || 55–40 ||  Boxscore || 2 || −5 || || ||
|-  style="text-align:center; background:#fbb;"
| 96 || July 27 || Reds || 3–6 || ||  Cardwell (3–9) || || 55,391 || Shea Stadium || 55–41 ||  Boxscore || 2 || −5 || || WOR-TV ||
|-  style="text-align:center; background:#bbb;"
| || July 29 || Astros || colspan=5|Postponed (rain); rescheduled for July 31 || Shea Stadium || || || || bgcolor="ffbbbb" | –5½ || || ||
|-  style="text-align:center; background:#fbb;"
| 97 || July 30 || Astros || 3–16 || || Koosman (8–6) || || N/A || Shea Stadium || 55–42 ||  Boxscore || 2 || −5½ || || ||
|-  style="text-align:center; background:#fbb;"
| 98 || July 30 || Astros || 5–11 || || Gentry (9–9) || || 28,922 || Shea Stadium || 55–43 ||  Boxscore || 2 || −5½ || || ||
|-  style="text-align:center; background:#fbb;"
| 99 || July 31 || Astros || 0–2 || || Seaver (15–6) || || 6,683 || Shea Stadium || 55–44 ||  Boxscore || 2 || −6½ || || WOR-TV ||
|-

|-  style="text-align:center; background:#bfb;"
| 100 || August 1 || Braves || 5–4 || Koonce (5–3) || Niekro (14–9) || Taylor (10) || 34,779 || Shea Stadium || 56–44 ||  Boxscore || 2 || −6½ || || WOR-TV ||
|-  style="text-align:center; background:#bfb;"
| 101 || August 2 || Braves || 1–0 || McAndrew (3–3) || Reed (10–8) || McGraw (6) || 37,442 || Shea Stadium || 57–44 ||  Boxscore || 2 || −6½ || || WOR-TV ||
|-  style="text-align:center; background:#bfb;"
| 102 || August 3 || Braves || 6–5(11)|| Taylor (6–2) || Raymond (2–2) || || 34,696 || Shea Stadium || 58–44 ||  Boxscore || 2 || −6½ || || WOR-TV ||
|-  style="text-align:center; background:#fbb;"
| 103 || August 4 || @ Reds || 0–1 || || Koosman (8–7) || || 13,228 || Crosley Field || 58–45 ||  Boxscore || 2 || −7½ || || ||
|-  style="text-align:center; background:#fbb;"
| 104 || August 5 || @ Reds || 5–8 || || Seaver (15–7) || || N/A || Crosley Field || 58–46 ||  Boxscore || 2 || −8 || || WOR-TV ||
|-  style="text-align:center; background:#bfb;"
| 105 || August 5 || @ Reds || 10–1 || Ryan (4–1) || || || 31,062 || Crosley Field || 59–46 ||  Boxscore || 2 || −8 || || WOR-TV ||
|-  style="text-align:center; background:#fbb;"
| 106 || August 6 || @ Reds || 2–3 || || McAndrew (3–4) || || 17,452 || Crosley Field || 59–47 ||  Boxscore || 2 || −9 || || WOR-TV ||
|-  style="text-align:center; background:#bfb;"
| 107 || August 8 || @ Braves || 4–1 || Koosman (9–7) || Pappas (5–8) || || N/A || Atlanta Stadium || 60–47 ||  Boxscore || 2 || −8½ || || WOR-TV ||
|-  style="text-align:center; background:#fbb;"
| 108 || August 8 || @ Braves || 0–1(10)|| Reed (11–8) || Taylor (6–3) || || 42,838 || Atlanta Stadium || 60–48 ||  Boxscore || 2 || −8½ || || WOR-TV ||
|-  style="text-align:center; background:#bfb;"
| 109 || August 9 || @ Braves || 5–3 || Seaver (16–7) || Stone (9–7) || Koonce (7) || 28,194 || Atlanta Stadium || 61–48 ||  Boxscore || 2 || −8½ || || || NBC
|-  style="text-align:center; background:#bfb;"
| 110 || August 10 || @ Braves || 3–0 ||  Cardwell (4–9) || Britton (5–3) || McGraw (7) || 18,224 || Atlanta Stadium || 62–48 ||  Boxscore || 2 || −7½ || || WOR-TV ||
|-  style="text-align:center; background:#fbb;"
| 111 || August 11 || @ Astros || 0–3 || || McAndrew (3–5) || || 21,798 || Astrodome || 62–49 ||  Boxscore || 2 || −8 || || ||
|-  style="text-align:center; background:#fbb;"
| 112 || August 12 || @ Astros || 7–8 || || Koosman (9–8) || || 22,283 || Astrodome || 62–50 ||  Boxscore || 2 || −9 || || WOR-TV ||
|-  style="text-align:center; background:#fbb;"
| 113 || August 13 || @ Astros || 2–8 || || Gentry (9–10) || || 30,590 || Astrodome || 62–51 ||  Boxscore || 3 || −10 || 8:30 PM EDT || WOR-TV ||
|-  style="text-align:center; background:#bbb;"
| || August 15 || Padres || colspan=5|Postponed (rain); rescheduled for August 17 || Shea Stadium || || || || bgcolor="ffbbbb" | –9½ || || ||
|-  style="text-align:center; background:#bfb;"
| 114 || August 16 || Padres || 2–0 || Seaver (17–7) || || Taylor (11) || N/A || Shea Stadium || 63–51 ||  Boxscore || 2 || −9 || || WOR-TV ||
|-  style="text-align:center; background:#bfb;"
| 115 || August 16 || Padres || 2–1 || McAndrew (4–5) || || McGraw (8) || 19,940 || Shea Stadium || 64–51 ||  Boxscore || 2 || −9 || || WOR-TV ||
|-  style="text-align:center; background:#bfb;"
| 116 || August 17 || Padres || 3–2 || Koosman (10–8) || || || N/A || Shea Stadium || 65–51 ||  Boxscore || 2 || −8 || || WOR-TV ||
|-  style="text-align:center; background:#bfb;"
| 117 || August 17 || Padres || 3–2 ||  Cardwell (5–9) || || Taylor (12) || 35,711 || Shea Stadium || 66–51 ||  Boxscore || 2 || −8 || || WOR-TV ||
|-  style="text-align:center; background:#bfb;"
| 118 || August 19 || Giants || 1–0(14)|| McGraw (6–2) || || || 48,968 || Shea Stadium || 67–51 ||  Boxscore || 2 || −8 || || WOR-TV ||
|-  style="text-align:center; background:#bfb;"
| 119 || August 20 || Giants || 6–0 || McAndrew (5–5) || || || 48,414 || Shea Stadium || 68–51 ||  Boxscore || 2 || −7 || || WOR-TV ||
|-  style="text-align:center; background:#fbb;"
| 120 || August 21 || Giants || 6–7(11)|| || Taylor (6–4) || || 42,795 || Shea Stadium || 68–52 ||  Boxscore || 2 || −7 || || WOR-TV ||
|-  style="text-align:center; background:#bfb;"
| 121 || August 22 || Dodgers || 5–3 || Koosman (11–8) || || McGraw (9) || 50,460 || Shea Stadium || 69–52 ||  Boxscore || 2 || −6 || ||  WOR-TV||
|-  style="text-align:center; background:#bfb;"
| 122 || August 23 || Dodgers || 3–2 || Taylor (7–4) || || || 40,974 || Shea Stadium || 70–52 ||  Boxscore || 2 || −6 || || WOR-TV ||
|-  style="text-align:center; background:#bfb;"
| 123 || August 24 || Dodgers || 7–4 || Koonce (6–3) || || || 48,435 || Shea Stadium || 71–52 ||  Boxscore || 2 || −5½ || || WOR-TV ||
|-  style="text-align:center; background:#bfb;"
| 124 || August 26 || @ Padres || 8–4 || Seaver (18–7) || || || N/A || San Diego Stadium || 72–52 ||  Boxscore || 2 || −3½ || || ||
|-  style="text-align:center; background:#bfb;"
| 125 || August 26 || @ Padres || 3–0 || McAndrew (6–5) || || || 8,873 || San Diego Stadium || 73–52 ||  Boxscore || 2 || −3½ || || ||
|-  style="text-align:center; background:#bfb;"
| 126 || August 27 || @ Padres || 4–1 || Koosman (12–8) || || || 5,525 || San Diego Stadium || 74–52 ||  Boxscore || 2 || −2½ || || ||
|-  style="text-align:center; background:#fbb;"
| 127 || August 29 || @ Giants || 0–5 || || Gentry (9–11) || || 13,843 || Candlestick Park || 74–53 ||  Boxscore || 2 || −4 || || ||
|-  style="text-align:center; background:#bfb;"
| 128 || August 30 || @ Giants || 3–2(10)|| McGraw (7–2) || || || 14,436 || Candlestick Park || 75–53 ||  Boxscore || 2 || −4 || || ||
|-  style="text-align:center; background:#bfb;"
| 129 || August 31 || @ Giants || 8–0 || Seaver (19–7) || || || N/A || Candlestick Park || 76–53 ||  Boxscore || 2 || −4½ || || ||
|-  style="text-align:center; background:#fbb;"
| 130 || August 31 || @ Giants || 2–3(11)|| || McGraw (7–3) || || 32,327 || Candlestick Park || 76–54 ||  Boxscore || 2 || −4½ || || ||
|-

|-  style="text-align:center; background:#fbb;"
| 131 || September 1 || @ Dodgers || 6–10 || || Koosman (12–9) || || 28,079 || Dodger Stadium || 76–55 ||  Boxscore || 2 || −5 || || WOR-TV ||
|-  style="text-align:center; background:#bfb;"
| 132 || September 2 || @ Dodgers || 5–4 || Gentry (10–11) || || McGraw (10) || 25,676 || Dodger Stadium || 77–55 ||  Boxscore || 2 || −5 || || ||
|-  style="text-align:center; background:#fbb;"
| 133 || September 3 || @ Dodgers || 4–5 || || DiLauro (1–4) || || 26,625 || Dodger Stadium || 77–56 ||  Boxscore || 2 || −5 || || ||
|-  style="text-align:center; background:#bfb;"
| 134 || September 5 || Phillies || 5–1 || Seaver (20–7) || || || N/A || Shea Stadium || 78–56 ||  Boxscore || 2 || −4½ || || ||
|-  style="text-align:center; background:#fbb;"
| 135 || September 5 || Phillies || 2–4 || || McAndrew (6–6) || || 40,450 || Shea Stadium || 78–57 ||  Boxscore || 2 || −4½ || || WOR-TV ||
|-  style="text-align:center; background:#bfb;"
| 136 || September 6 || Phillies || 3–0 ||  Cardwell (6–9) || || McGraw (11) || 20,477 || Shea Stadium || 79–57 ||  Boxscore || 2 || −3½ || || WOR-TV || NBC
|-  style="text-align:center; background:#bfb;"
| 137 || September 7 || Phillies || 9–3 || Ryan (5–1) || || || 28,937 || Shea Stadium || 80–57 ||  Boxscore || 2 || −2½ || || WOR-TV ||
|-  style="text-align:center; background:#bfb;"
| 138 || September 8 || Cubs || 3–2 || Koosman (13–9) || || || 43,274 || Shea Stadium || 81–57 ||  Boxscore || 2 || −1½ || || WOR-TV ||
|-  style="text-align:center; background:#bfb;"
| 139 || September 9 || Cubs || 7–1 || Seaver (21–7) || Jenkins (19–13) || || 51,448 || Shea Stadium || 82–57 ||  Boxscore || 2 || -½ || || WOR-TV ||
|-  style="text-align:center; background:#bfb;"
| 140 || September 10 || Expos || 3–2(12)|| Taylor (8–4) || || || N/A || Shea Stadium || 83–57 ||  Boxscore || 1 || +1 || || WOR-TV ||
|-  style="text-align:center; background:#bfb;"
| 141 || September 10 || Expos || 7–1 || Ryan (6–1) || || || 23,512 || Shea Stadium || 84–57 ||  Boxscore || 1 || +1 || || WOR-TV ||
|-  style="text-align:center; background:#bfb;"
| 142 || September 11 || Expos || 4–0 || Gentry (11–11) || || || 10,713 || Shea Stadium || 85–57 ||  Boxscore || 1 || +2 || || ||
|-  style="text-align:center; background:#bfb;"
| 143 || September 12 || @ Pirates || 1–0 || Koosman (14–9) || || || N/A || Forbes Field || 86–57 || Boxscore || 1 || +2½ || 6:05 PM EDT || ||
|-  style="text-align:center; background:#bfb;"
| 144 || September 12 || @ Pirates || 1–0 ||  Cardwell (7–9) || || McGraw (12) || 19,303 || Forbes Field || 87–57 || Boxscore || 1 || +2½ || 8:49 PM EDT || WOR-TV ||
|-  style="text-align:center; background:#bfb;"
| 145 || September 13 || @ Pirates || 5–2 || Seaver (22–7) || || || 10,440 || Forbes Field || 88–57 || Boxscore || 1 || +3½ || 4:15 PM EDT || WOR-TV || NBC
|-  style="text-align:center; background:#fbb;"
| 146 || September 14 || @ Pirates || 3–5 || || Ryan (6–2) || || 11,324 || Forbes Field || 88–58 || Boxscore || 1 || +3½ || 1:35 PM EDT || WOR-TV ||
|-  style="text-align:center; background:#bfb;"
| 147 || September 15 || @ Cardinals || 4–3 || McGraw (8–3) || || || 13,086 || Busch Memorial Stadium || 89–58 ||  Boxscore || 1 || +4½ || 9:00 PM EDT || WOR-TV ||
|-  style="text-align:center; background:#bbb;"
| || September 16 || @ Cardinals || colspan=5|Postponed (rain); rescheduled for September 22 || Busch Memorial Stadium || || || || bgcolor="bbffbb" | +4 || || ||
|-  style="text-align:center; background:#bfb;"
| 148 || September 17 || @ Expos || 5–0 || Koosman (15–9) || || || 10,422 || Jarry Park || 90–58 ||  Boxscore || 1 || +4 || || ||
|-  style="text-align:center; background:#bfb;"
| 149 || September 18 || @ Expos || 2–0 || Seaver (23–7) || || || 13,280 || Jarry Park || 91–58 ||  Boxscore || 1 || +5 || || ||
|-  style="text-align:center; background:#fbb;"
| 150 || September 19 || Pirates || 2–8 || || Ryan (6–3) || || N/A || Shea Stadium || 91–59 ||  Boxscore || 1 || +4 || || ||
|-  style="text-align:center; background:#fbb;"
| 151 || September 19 || Pirates || 0–8 || || McAndrew (6–7) || || 51,885 || Shea Stadium || 91–60 ||  Boxscore || 1 || +4 || || ||
|-  style="text-align:center; background:#fbb;"
| 152 || September 20 || Pirates || 0–4 || || Gentry (11–12) || || 38,784 || Shea Stadium || 91–61 ||  Boxscore || 1 || +4 || || WOR-TV ||
|-  style="text-align:center; background:#bfb;"
| 153 || September 21 || Pirates || 5–3 || Koosman (16–9) || || || N/A || Shea Stadium || 92–61 ||  Boxscore || 1 || +4½ || || WOR-TV ||
|-  style="text-align:center; background:#bfb;"
| 154 || September 21 || Pirates || 6–1 ||  Cardwell (8–9) || || || 55,901 || Shea Stadium || 93–61 ||  Boxscore || 1 || +4½ || || WOR-TV ||
|-  style="text-align:center; background:#bfb;"
| 155 || September 22 || Cardinals || 3–1 || Seaver (24–7) || || || 23,267 || Shea Stadium || 94–61 ||  Boxscore || 1 || +5 || || ||
|-  style="text-align:center; background:#bfb;"
| 156 || September 23 || Cardinals || 3–2(11)|| McGraw (9–3) || || || 32,364 || Shea Stadium || 95–61 ||  Boxscore || 1 || +6 || || WOR-TV ||
|-  style="text-align:center; background:#007800;"
|  ||  ||  ||  ||   ||   || ||  ||  ||  ||  ||  ||  || ||  ||
|-  style="text-align:center; background:#bfb;"
| 158 || September 26 || @ Phillies || 5–0 || Koosman (17–9) || || || 6,288 || Connie Mack Stadium || 97–61 ||  Boxscore || 1 || +7 || || WOR-TV ||
|-  style="text-align:center; background:#bfb;"
| 159 || September 27 || @ Phillies || 1–0 || Seaver (25–7) || || || 4,297 || Connie Mack Stadium || 98–61 ||  Boxscore || 1 || +8 || || ||
|-  style="text-align:center; background:#bfb;"
| 160 || September 28 || @ Phillies || 2–0 || Gentry (13–12) || || Taylor (13) || 6,875 || Connie Mack Stadium || 99–61 ||  Boxscore || 1 || +8 || || ||
|-

|-  style="text-align:center; background:#bfb;"
| 161 || October 1 || @ Cubs || 6–5(12)|| Taylor (9–4) || || Johnson (1) || 10,136 || Wrigley Field || 100–61 ||  Boxscore || 1 || +9 || 2:30 PM EDT || ||
|-  style="text-align:center; background:#fbb;"
| 162 || October 2 || @ Cubs || 3–5 || ||  Cardwell (8–10) || || 9,981 || Wrigley Field || 100–62 ||  Boxscore || 1 || +8 || 2:30 PM EDT || ||
|-

All times are EASTERN time
 All games broadcast on WJRZ and METS RADIO NETWORK

Postseason 

|-  style="text-align:center; background:#bfb;"
| 1 || October 4 || @ Braves || 9–5 || Seaver (1–0) || Niekro (0–1) || || 50,122 || Atlanta Stadium || Boxscore || 4:10 PM EDT || WOR-TV || NBC
|-  style="text-align:center; background:#bfb;"
| 2 || October 5 || @ Braves || 11–6 || Taylor (1–0) || Reed (0–1) || McGraw (1) || 50,270 || Atlanta Stadium || Boxscore || 4:10 PM EDT || WOR-TV || NBC
|-  style="text-align:center; background:#bfb;"
| 3 || October 6 || Braves || 7–4 || Ryan (1–0) || Jarvis (0–1) || || 54,195 || Shea Stadium || Boxscore || 1:10 PM EDT || WOR-TV || NBC
|-

|-  style="text-align:center; background:#fbb;"
| 1 || October 11 || @ Orioles || 1–4 || Cuellar (1–0) || Seaver (0–1) || || 50,429 || Memorial Stadium || Boxscore|| 1:00 PM EDT || WOR-TV || NBC || NBC
|-  style="text-align:center; background:#bfb;"
| 2 || October 12 || @ Orioles || 2–1 || Koosman (1–0) || McNally (0–1) || Taylor (1) || 50,850 || Memorial Stadium || Boxscore || 2:00 PM EDT || WOR-TV || NBC || NBC
|-  style="text-align:center; background:#bfb;"
| 3 || October 14 || Orioles || 5–0 || Gentry (1–0) || Palmer (0–1) || Ryan (1) || 56,335 || Shea Stadium || Boxscore || 1:00 PM EDT || WOR-TV || NBC || NBC
|-  style="text-align:center; background:#bfb;"
| 4 || October 15 || Orioles || 2–1 (10) || Seaver (1–1) || Hall (0–1) || || 57,367 || Shea Stadium || Boxscore || 1:00 PM EDT || WOR-TV || NBC || NBC
|-  style="text-align:center; background:#bfb;"
| 5 || October 16 || Orioles || 5–3 || Koosman (2–0) || Watt (0–1) || || 57,397 || Shea Stadium || Boxscore || 1:00 PM EDT || WOR-TV || NBC || NBC
|-

All times are EASTERN time
 1969 NLCS broadcast on WJRZ and METS RADIO NETWORK

Attendance

Roster

The final out 
With two outs in the top of the ninth inning, starting pitcher Jerry Koosman faced Orioles second baseman Davey Johnson (who later managed the Mets to their second World Series championship in 1986). After taking a pitch of two balls and one strike, Johnson hit a fly-ball out to left field which was caught by Cleon Jones.

Hall of Fame members who played in the 1969 World Series 
Two future Hall of Fame members were on that Mets' roster: pitcher Tom Seaver (who won twenty-five games en route to winning the Cy Young Award) and a young Nolan Ryan (playing in his third season). Seaver was inducted into the Hall of Fame in 1992 and Ryan in 1999.  Manager Gil Hodges was elected to the Hall in 2022.

The Baltimore Orioles boasted four future Hall of Famers on their roster: pitcher Jim Palmer, outfielder Frank Robinson, third baseman Brooks Robinson, and manager Earl Weaver.

Opening Day starters 
 Tommie Agee
 Ken Boswell
 Ed Charles
 Rod Gaspar
 Jerry Grote
 Bud Harrelson
 Cleon Jones
 Ed Kranepool
 Tom Seaver

Notable transactions 
 June 13, 1969: Al Jackson was purchased from the Mets by the Cincinnati Reds.
 June 15, 1969: Kevin Collins, Steve Renko, Bill Carden (minors) and Dave Colon (minors) were traded by the Mets to the Montreal Expos for Donn Clendenon.

Player stats

Batting

Starters by position 
Note: Pos = Position; G = Games played; AB = At bats; H = Hits; Avg. = Batting average; HR = Home runs; RBI = Runs batted in

Other batters 
Note: G = Games played; AB = At bats; H = Hits; Avg. = Batting average; HR = Home runs; RBI = Runs batted in

Pitching

Starting pitchers 
Note: G = Games pitched; IP = Innings pitched; W = Wins; L = Losses; ERA = Earned run average; SO = Strikeouts

Other pitchers 
Note: G = Games pitched; IP = Innings pitched; W = Wins; L = Losses; ERA = Earned run average; SO = Strikeouts

Relief pitchers 
Note: G = Games pitched; W = Wins; L = Losses; SV = Saves; ERA = Earned run average; SO = Strikeouts

NLCS

Game 1 
Saturday, October 4, 1969, at Atlanta Stadium in Atlanta

Game 2 
Sunday, October 5, 1969, at Atlanta Stadium in Atlanta, Georgia

Game 3 
Monday, October 6, 1969, at Shea Stadium in Queens, New York

World Series

Game 1 
Saturday, October 11, 1969, at Memorial Stadium in Baltimore, Maryland

Game 2 
Sunday, October 12, 1969, at Memorial Stadium in Baltimore, Maryland

Game 3 
Tuesday, October 14, 1969, at Shea Stadium in Flushing, Queens, New York

Game 4 
Wednesday, October 15, 1969, at Shea Stadium in Flushing, Queens, New York

Game 5 
Thursday, October 16, 1969, at Shea Stadium in Flushing, Queens, New York

In popular culture 
In the movie Oh, God!, God, as played by George Burns, explains to John Denver that "the last miracle I performed was the 1969 Mets."

Part of the movie Frequency is set in Queens, New York, in 1969, as firefighter and avid Mets fan Frank Sullivan (Dennis Quaid) and his family follow the "Amazin's" throughout the World Series.

In Moonlighting, Season 2, Episode 13, "In God We Strongly Suspect", when David is attempting to define the parameters of Maddie's skepticism and atheism by inviting her to provide logical explanations for various phenomena seemingly beyond man's understanding, he mentions the "'69 Mets" which she immediately dismisses as "a myth and a hoax".

In his song "Faith and Fear in Flushing Meadows", twee/folk artist Harry Breitner makes mention of Tom Seaver and Jerry Koosman.

In the TV sitcom Everybody Loves Raymond episode "Big Shots", Ray and Robert visit the Baseball Hall of Fame to meet members of the '69 Mets.

In the film Men in Black 3, set shortly before the Apollo 11 launch in July 1969, Griffin, an alien from the fifth dimension who can see the future, says the Mets' title is his favorite human history moment for "all the improbabilities that helped".

In the TV show Growing Pains, the family's name was the Seavers and their neighbors were the Koosmans.

In the TV Sitcom The Simpsons episode MoneyBart, Homer Simpson says the 1969 Mets will live on forever.

Awards and honors

Awards

40th Major League Baseball All-Star Game 

Outfielders

Pitchers

Draft

Farm system 

LEAGUE CHAMPIONS: Memphis

Notes

External links 

 1969 New York Mets at Baseball Reference
 1969 New York Mets at Baseball Almanac
 1969 – New York Mets Win Their First World Series A report from K.C. Connors of WCBS Newsradio 880 (WCBS-AM New York) Part of WCBS 880's celebration of 40 years of newsradio
 Never-Seen Pics of the Miracle Mets —slideshow by Life magazine

New York Mets season
National League champion seasons
National League East champion seasons
New York Mets seasons
World Series champion seasons
New York Mets
1960s in Queens